Bella's Italian Bakery is a bakery in Portland, Oregon.

Description
Bella's Italian Bakery is a 24-seat bakery at the intersection of Woodstock Boulevard and 92nd Avenue in southeast Portland's Lents neighborhood. The menu has included cannoli, ciambella crumb cake, sfincione bread, sfogliatelle clamshells with a semolina ricotta filling, pepperoni rolls, jam tarts, and tiramisu. Pizzas, sandwiches, coffee drinks, and wine are also available. The business also sells groceries such as pickled peppers, olives, cherries, cheese, pancetta, and sausage.

History
Owner Michelle Vernier opened the bakery in November 2018. Bella's hosts pizza night weekly, as of 2021.

Reception

David Landsel included Bella's in Food & Wine 2020 list of "The 100 Best Bakeries in America".

Brooke Jackson-Glidden included the bakery in Eater Portland 2021 overviews of "The Ideal Portland Spots to Load Up on Picnic Supplies" and "15 Portland Restaurants Where You Can Also Buy Your Groceries". The website's Nathan Williams included Bella's in a 2022 list of "Where to Eat and Drink in Lents". Michelle Lopez and Jackson-Glidden included the business in Eater Portland 2022 list of "Outstanding Bakeries in Portland and Beyond".

Karen Brooks and Katherine Chew Hamilton included Bella's in Portland Monthly 2022 "Opinionated Guide to Portland's Best Bakeries".

See also

 List of bakeries
 List of Italian restaurants

References

External links
 

2018 establishments in Oregon
Bakeries of Oregon
Italian restaurants in Portland, Oregon
Italian-American cuisine
Lents, Portland, Oregon
Restaurants established in 2018